My Voyage to Italy is a personal documentary by acclaimed Italian-American director Martin Scorsese. The film is a voyage through Italian cinema history, marking influential films for Scorsese and particularly covering the Italian neorealism period.

The films of Roberto Rossellini  account for half the films discussed in the entire documentary, dealing with his seminal influence on Italian cinema and cinema history. Other directors mentioned include Vittorio de Sica, Luchino Visconti, Federico Fellini and Michelangelo Antonioni.

It was released in 1999 at a length of four hours. Two years later, it was screened out of competition at the 2001 Cannes Film Festival.

Films discussed
Rome, Open City (Roma città aperta) (1945), directed by Roberto Rossellini
Paisà (1946), directed by Roberto Rossellini
1860 (1934), directed by Alessandro Blasetti
Fabiola (1949), directed by Alessandro Blasetti
The Iron Crown (La corona di ferro) (1941), directed by Alessandro Blasetti
Cabiria (1914), directed by Giovanni Pastrone
La terra trema (1948), directed by Luchino Visconti
Bicycle Thieves (1948), directed by Vittorio De Sica
Fantasia sottomarina (1940), directed by Roberto Rossellini
Viaggio in Italia (Journey to Italy) (1954), directed by Roberto Rossellini 
La Prise de pouvoir par Louis XIV (1966), directed by Roberto Rossellini 
Germany Year Zero (1947), directed by Roberto Rossellini
The Miracle (Il miracolo) segment (1948) of L'Amore, directed by Roberto Rossellini
Stromboli (1950), directed by Roberto Rossellini
The Flowers of St. Francis (Francesco, giullare di Dio) (1950), directed by Roberto Rossellini
Europa '51 (1952), directed by Roberto Rossellini
Gli uomini, che mascalzoni! (1932), directed by Mario Camerini with Vittorio De Sica as Bruno
Il signor Max (1937), directed by Mario Camerini with Vittorio De Sica as Gianni/Max Varaldo
Shoeshine (Sciuscià) (1946), directed by Vittorio De Sica
Umberto D (1952), directed by Vittorio De Sica
The Roof (Il tetto) (1956), directed by Vittorio De Sica
Two Women (La ciociara) (1961), directed by Vittorio De Sica
The Garden of the Finzi-Continis (Il giardino dei Finzi-Contini) (1970), directed by Vittorio De Sica
The Gold of Naples (L'oro di Napoli) (1954), directed by Vittorio De Sica
Les Bas-fonds (The Lower Depths) (1936), directed by Jean Renoir
Ossessione (1943), directed by Luchino Visconti
Giorni di Gloria (Days of Glory) (1945), directed by Giuseppe De Santis, Mario Serandrei, Marcello Pagliero and Luchino Visconti
Bellissima (1951), directed by Luchino Visconti, with Alessandro Blasetti, a film director, appears as himself.
Senso (1954), directed by Luchino Visconti
I vitelloni (1953), directed by Federico Fellini
La Strada (1955), directed by Federico Fellini
Nights of Cabiria ( Le notti di Cabiria) (1957), directed by Federico Fellini
La Dolce Vita (1960), directed by Federico Fellini
8½ (1963), directed by Federico Fellini
Divorzio all'italiana (Divorce, Italian Style) (1961), directed by Pietro Germi
L'avventura (1960), directed by Michelangelo Antonioni
La Notte (The Night) (1961), directed by Michelangelo Antonioni
L'eclisse (1962), directed by Michelangelo Antonioni

References

Further reading

External links
 
 

1999 films
1999 documentary films
American documentary films
Italian documentary films
Documentary films about Italy
Documentary films about Italian-American culture
Documentary films about the film industry
Documentary films about film directors and producers
Films directed by Martin Scorsese
Films with screenplays by Suso Cecchi d'Amico
Roberto Rossellini
Italian-language American films
1990s American films